Nebojša "Neša" Ilić (born 26 February 1968) is a Serbian basketball executive and former player. He is currently serving as the team manager for Crvena zvezda and the Serbia national basketball team.

Playing career

Crvena zvezda (1985–1993, 1995–1997) 
Ilić spent most of his professional career in his hometown-based team Crvena zvezda. Ilić holds the Yugoslav Basketball League record for points in one game. On November 21, 1992, in a game against Vojvodina, he scored 71 points and set the league record.

After the 1996–97 season, Ilić retires from professional basketball. In ten seasons with the Zvezda, he played 304 games (tied with Zoran Slavnić) and scored 4,732 points.

Cáceres (1993–1995) 
Ilić had a stint with Spanish team Cáceres. He played two Liga ACB seasons there. The most important achievement there was the semifinals of the 1994–95 FIBA Korać Cup.

National team career

Youth
Ilić was a member of the gold medal-winning Yugoslav cadet team at the 1985 European Championship for Cadets in Ruse, Bulgaria. Over seven tournament games as the team's leading scorer, he averaged 20.4 points per game. 

One year later, Ilić made the Yugoslavia national under-18 team at the 1986 FIBA Europe Under-18 Championship in Austria. Playing on the gold-winning team, over seven tournament games, he averaged the team-leading 15.0 points per game. 

Ilić was a member of the Yugoslavia national under-19 team that won the gold medal at the 1987 FIBA Under-19 World Championship in Bormio, Italy. Over six tournament games as the team's leading scorer, he averaged 15.3 points per game.

In each of the three tournaments, Svetislav Pešić was the head coach, while Vlade Divac, Toni Kukoč, Radenko Dobraš, and Slaviša Koprivica were his teammates.

Basketball executive career

Crvena zvezda (2001–present) 
Ilić have been serving as a team manager of Crvena zvezda since 2001. On September 19, 2017, he became a sports director of the Zvezda. He left the sports director office in October 2019.

As a staff manager of the Zvezda, Ilić won as follows:
7 Serbian League championships (2014–15, 2015–16, 2016–17, 2017–18, 2018–19, 2020–21, 2021–22), 
8 National Cup tournaments (2004, 2006, 2013, 2014, 2015, 2017, 2021, 2022). 
6 Adriatic League championships (2015, 2016, 2017, 2019, 2021, and 2022), and
1 Adriatic Supercup tournament (2018).

Serbia national team (2010–present) 
In 2010, Ilić joined the Serbia national basketball team's staff as the team manager. Since then, he worked with four head coaches; Dušan Ivković, Aleksandar Đorđević, Igor Kokoškov, and current Svetislav Pešić.

Ilić won three silver medals with the national team: 2014 FIBA Basketball World Cup, 2016 Summer Olympics, and EuroBasket 2017.

See also 
 KK Crvena zvezda accomplishments and records
 List of KK Crvena zvezda players with 100 games played
 List of Liga ACB annual free throw percentage leaders

References

External links

 Nebojša Ilić at Crvena zvezda website
 Nebojša Ilić at ACB League website
 Na današnji dan: Rođen Nebojša Ilić

1968 births
Living people
Basketball players from Belgrade
KK Crvena Zvezda executives
KK Crvena zvezda players
Liga ACB players
Serbian basketball executives and administrators
Serbian men's basketball players
Serbian expatriate basketball people in Spain
Shooting guards
Yugoslav men's basketball players